The Oxfordshire Historic Churches Trust (OHCT) provides financial support with repairs and certain improvements to churches and chapels in Oxfordshire, England, without regard to their denomination. It encourages interest in Oxfordshire churches and chapels and undertakes fundraising, partly through an annual sponsored 'Ride & Stride' event held in September, and through JustGiving.

The Trust was established in 1964 and since its inception the value of the Trust's grants to churches and chapels has amounted to some £3.5 million (2011). Sir Hugo Brunner, formerly Lord Lieutenant of Oxfordshire is a Trustee. The President is Christopher H Walton MBE.

References

External links 
 OHCT website
 Oxfordshire Churches & Chapels

Organizations established in 1964
Oxfordshire Historic Churches Trust
History of Oxfordshire
Charities based in Oxfordshire
1964 establishments in England